A partial lunar eclipse will take place on August 19, 2035.

Visibility

Related lunar eclipses

Lunar year series

Tzolkinex 
 Preceded: Lunar eclipse of July 6, 2028

 Followed: Lunar eclipse of September 29, 2042

See also
List of lunar eclipses and List of 21st-century lunar eclipses

Notes

External links

2035-08
2035-08
2035 in science